Coded Smears and More Uncommon Slurs is a compilation album by British grindcore band Napalm Death, released on 30 March 2018 through Century Media. It contains previously unreleased material from various album recording sessions, b-sides, limited edition bonus tracks and split recordings. A music video for "Standardization", the compilation's opening track, was released on 8 May 2018.

Critical reception

Coded Smears and More Uncommon Slurs was well received by critics. Dean Brown of Metal Hammer considered the album "certainly a very useful stopgap release for fans of the legendary band who have missed out on all of the extra gems included on various release formats during this period", stressing the high quality of the songwriting and the order of the songs: "By eschewing the chronological approach, this compilation has been carefully arranged to flow naturally like a studio album.". Jay H. Gorania, rating the album 9 out of 10 for Blabbermouth.net, shared this view: "It truly feels like a new album worth digesting like any other new Napalm effort." He concluded that the album "isn't anything new. But it does represent everything that is right with intense music in terms of sound and spirit. The masters deliver yet again."

Track listing

Personnel

Napalm Death
 Barney Greenway – vocals
 Mitch Harris – guitars
 Shane Embury – bass
 Danny Herrera – drums

Technical personnel
 Frode Sylthe – album art, layout

References

2018 albums
Napalm Death albums
Century Media Records albums